Paragendria papuanensis is a species of nematode parasite. It parasitises freshwater fishes from Papua New Guinea, particularly Glossamia gjellerupi and Melanotaenia affinis.

Description

References

Ascaridida
Parasitic nematodes of fish
Freshwater fish
Fauna of Papua New Guinea